Neuro may refer to:

 Neuro (video game), a 2006 video game
 Characters in the novel Brain Jack by Brian L. Falkner, who wear neuro headsets and whose consciousness has become hijacked
 Neurofunk, a subgenre of drum and bass
 Majin Tantei Nōgami Neuro, a Japanese manga series written and illustrated by Yūsei Matsui